Josh Rourke is a professional rugby league footballer who plays as a  for the Whitehaven R.L.F.C. in the Betfred Championship.

Club career

Salford Red Devils 
In September 2022 Rourke made his Salford debut in the Super League against the Warrington Wolves.

Whitehaven RLFC 
On 25 October 2022 it was announced that Rourke had signed a one-year deal with Whitehaven R.L.F.C.

References

External links
Salford Red Devils profile

1999 births
Living people
English rugby league players
Rugby league fullbacks
Salford Red Devils players
Whitehaven R.L.F.C. players